Running with Beto is a 2019 documentary film following Beto O'Rourke's campaign in the 2018 United States Senate election in Texas. The film debuted at the 2019 South by Southwest (SXSW) Film Festival where it won the Audience Award, and premiered on HBO on May 28, 2019.

References

External links 
 

American documentary films
Beto O'Rourke
Documentary films about American politicians
Documentary films about elections in the United States
Documentary films about Texas
Films set in the 2010s
HBO documentary films
2019 films
2019 documentary films
2010s English-language films
2010s American films
English-language documentary films